San Vicente de Tagua Tagua Airport was an airstrip  east-southeast of San Vicente de Tagua Tagua, a city in the O'Higgins Region of Chile.

Google Earth Historical Imagery (2/22/2011) shows a  grass airstrip running through a cultivated field. The (10/8/2011) image shows the runway planted with crops. Current imagery shows no trace of the runway.

See also

Transport in Chile
List of airports in Chile

References 

Google Earth Historical Imgagery (10/8/2011)

External links 
 Airport record for San Vicente de Tagua Tagua Airport at Landings.com

Defunct airports
Airports in Chile
Airports in O'Higgins Region